Hygroplasta utricula is a moth in the family Lecithoceridae. It was described by Chun-Sheng Wu and Kyu-Tek Park in 1998. It is found in Sri Lanka.

The wingspan is 12–14 mm. The forewings are ochreous with a blackish-brown pattern. The fold-dot is small and the discal spots are large. The hindwings are ochreous to brown.

Etymology
The species name is derived from Latin utriculus (meaning small bag).

References

Moths described in 1998
Hygroplasta